Vladimir Aleksandrovich Wagner (March 29, 1849 – March 8, 1934) was a Russian psychologist and naturalist known for his studies of comparative and evolutionary psychology. He also studied spiders, and in 1882 proposed the first classification of spider families based on copulatory organs.

He studied law at Moscow University and from 1882, the natural sciences. After earning a doctorate in zoology, he began teaching 1895 at the Institute of Psycho-Neurology St. Petersburg.

References

1849 births
1934 deaths
Psychologists from Saint Petersburg
19th-century zoologists from the Russian Empire
Soviet arachnologists
People from Kaluga
Academic staff of Saint Petersburg State University
Imperial Moscow University alumni